Noble, My Love (Hangul 고결한 그대) is a 2015 South Korean web drama starring Sung Hoon and Kim Jae-kyung.
A chance meeting with a veterinarian turns a successful CEO's life around.

Synopsis 
Lee Kang Hoon (Sung Hoon) is a wealthy heir who is attractive, but he cares little for the feelings of other people. Cha Yoon Seo (Kim Jae-kyung) is a cheerful and lovely veterinarian who runs her own animal hospital. After the two meet in an unexpected crisis, can feelings of dislike turn into feelings of love?

Plot 
Cha Yoon Seo runs an animal hospital in Dalsan-ri, South Korea. In the first episode, Cha Yoon Seo ends up in Seoul for a veterinarian reunion. On her way back from the reunion, she stops at a convenience store where she has a chance meeting with Lee Kang Hoon, the CEO of a famous corporation D.O.L. In episode 2, Lee Kang Hoon is kidnapped and eventually stabbed by the kidnappers. Lee Kang Hoon is able to fight his way out of the situation but, due to his injury, he ends up on the front step of the animal hospital. Cha Yoon Seo stitches up Lee Kang Hoon and he ends up falling asleep at the animal hospital. When he awakens, he calls his secretary and gets a ride home. While in the car, Lee Kang Hoon gets a call from his mother inquiring where he has been and then immediately starts telling him he needs to go on blind dates so that he can get married.

In the next few episodes, Lee Kang Hoon wishes to repay Cha Yoon Seo by buying her a new animal hospital in Seoul so that she can acquire more business. Cha Yoon Seo does not appreciate the gesture as he does everything in his power to force her to take the offer. She eventually caves and opens the Apsung Animal Hospital in Seoul. Eventually, as Lee Kang Hoon and Cha Yoon Seo get to know each other, Lee Kang Hoon proposes a contract relationship so that Lee Kang Hoon's mother stops pushing him to go on blind dates. While in the contract, Lee Kang Hoon and Cha Yoon Seo begin to develop feelings for each other and begin to officially date. However, once Lee Kang Hoon's mother comes into town, she does not approve of the relationship. Cha Yoon Seo is from rural South Korea and her parents own an apple orchard. As such, she is considered lower class and not considered worthy of Lee Kang Hoon, according to the mother's standards.

Lee Kang Hoon's mother wishes to test Cha Yoon Seo's love/loyalty to Lee Kang Hoon and tries to force her to sign another contract. The contract has strict rules which Cha Yoon Seo refuses to sign. Afterwards, Cha Yoon Seo goes back home to help her family at the orchard and refresh. However, Lee Kang Hoon is determined to marry Cha Yoon Seo and ends up finding her at the orchard where they are reunited. Lee Kang Hoon and Cha Yoon Seo ended up marrying each other and they live happily ever after.

Cast 
 Sung Hoon as Lee Kang-hoon
 Kim Jae-kyung as Cha Yoon-seo
 Park Eun-seok as Woo Sang-hyun
 Kim Dong-suk as Lee Kang-joon
 Park Shin-woon as Secretary Kang
 Lee Seung-un as Heo Jin-yung
 Seo Young as Moon Yoo-ra
 Lee Bit-na as Choi Ra-mi
 Seo Geun-soo as Cha Yoon-soo

Episodes

Theme of marriage 
"Influenced by Confucian values and its traditional family system, South Koreans view marriage as solidifying the bond between two families, rather than between two individuals". This value is prevalent in Noble, My Love as the male lead, Lee Kang Hoon, is consistently being pressured to go on blind dates with women who come from wealthy families. In a culture that is heavily reliant on social standing, marrying someone with money or influence goes a long way in securing a good and stress-free future. As such, once the relationship develops between Lee Kang Hoon and the female lead, Cha Yoon Seo, Lee Kang Hoon's mother disapproves of the relationship due to Cha Yoon Seo's familial background. While the younger generation may have different views on marrying for love rather than arrangement, "the influence of traditional values still persists [and] Korean parents actively participate in partner selection".

Concurrently, Cha Yoon Seo, is reminded by friends and clients that she must get married before she reaches the age of 30. In the article Eros and Modernity: Convulsions of the Heart in Modern Korea, a young lady speaks of how she believes she is causing a great deal of stress for her father since she has not found a suitable husband and she is about to reach the "prime age" of 30. As she states in the article, "women are like a Christmas cake, everyone wants to buy one before the 25th but after 25 it becomes harder to sell one and at 30 no-one buys them anymore". Cha Yoon Seo is in a similar position as she decided to focus on building up her veterinarian practice instead of dating and getting married.

There is an evident generational gap between traditional family systems and the more modern view of the younger generation. It can be argued that these pre-existing societal pressures is one reason why the younger generation is hesitating to marry and start a family. As of 2010 in South Korea, "the percentage of unmarried women aged 30 to 34 nearly doubled, rising to 19% from 10.5%". Additionally, in the same year, "more than half of Korean men in their early 30s were unmarried".

Prior to marriage, in Noble, My Love, Cha Yoon Seo moves into Lee Kang Hoon's home. Instead of marriage, the ideal of cohabitation is becoming a more prevalent among younger Koreans yet they do not tell their parents as it "has long been frowned upon in the conservative society". Cohabitation is a means of being together without the pressures of marriage brought upon by the traditional Confucian family values.

International Broadcasting  
  Pakistan – H Now Entertainment (Coming Soon)

References 

Korean Broadcasting System television dramas
Television shows based on South Korean webtoons
Naver TV original programming
2015 web series debuts
South Korean drama web series
2015 web series endings